The Colombia national baseball team (Spanish: Selección de béisbol de Colombia) is the national baseball team of Colombia. The team represents Colombia in international competitions.

History 
The Colombian national team first participated in the Amateur World Series ― which would become the Baseball World Cup ― in 1944, finishing sixth. It would go on to win the 1947 edition, which it hosted in Barranquilla. Colombia again hosted, and won, in 1965, though the Colombian government notably denied the defending-champion Cuban team entry into the country, due to tensions with Fidel Castro's government.

In 2017, Colombia defeated Spain and Panama to secure their first ever appearance in the World Baseball Classic. The 2017 team was managed by Luis Urueta. Its pitching staff was anchored by Major Leaguers José Quintana and Julio Teheran, and included then-prospects Jorge Alfaro and Gio Urshela. However, the group was placed in the Pool C — meaning its "very tough" competitors would be the United States, the Dominican Republic, and Canada. Colombia ultimately finished third in the division and did not move on to the second round, though it did manage to defeat Canada 4–1	at Marlins Park in Miami.

The team tried but failed to qualify for the 2020 Olympics at the eight-team Americas Qualifying Event on May 31 through June 5, 2021.

As a participant in the 2017 WBC, Colombia automatically qualified for the expanded 2023 World Baseball Classic. It was placed in a group with the United States, Canada, Mexico, and a fifth team to be determined by qualification. On July 29, 2022, the team announced that Urueta would return to coach the national team for the WBC.

Results and fixtures
The following is a list of professional baseball match results currently active in the latest version of the WBSC World Rankings, as well as any future matches that have been scheduled.

Legend

2019

2022

2023

Current roster

International tournaments

World Baseball Classic

Baseball World Cup

Pan American Games

Intercontinental Cup

U-23 Baseball World Cup

References

National baseball teams
Baseball
National